"Skateaway" is a 1980 rock song by Dire Straits, dealing with a female roller-skater breezing through busy city streets, while listening to a portable radio through her headphones. It appears on the band's 1980 album Making Movies. It was released as a single in 1980, and in January 1981 peaked at number 58 on the Billboard Hot 100 and number 37 on the UK Singles Chart. The song was accompanied by a video that was popular on MTV, featuring musician Jayzik Azikiwe as Rollergirl. The daughter of Nigeria's first President, Nnamdi Azikiwe,  she was credited as Jay Carly in the video directed by Lester Bookbinder.

Record World said that the narrative is "as vivid as [Knopfler's] guitar is distinctive".  Ultimate Classic Rock critic Michael Gallucci rated "Skateaway" as Dire Straits' 7th best song, saying that it "sticks closer to a traditional rock-radio format" than the other songs on Making Movies.

Charts

See also
 Video for 2014 song Gold by Chet Faker featured three female roller-skaters

References

External links
 
 Jayzik Azikiwe (1958-2008)

Dire Straits songs
1980 singles
Songs written by Mark Knopfler
1980 songs
Song recordings produced by Mark Knopfler
Song recordings produced by Jimmy Iovine